Yoker railway station serves the district of Yoker, Scotland.

The station is served by ScotRail as part of the SPT network, on the Argyle and 
North Clyde Lines.

It is the nearest railway station to the Renfrew Ferry on the north side of the River Clyde.

The large Yoker Traction Maintenance Depot, which looks after the EMU fleet used on North Clyde suburban services, is a short distance to the east, towards .  Yoker IECC is also nearby - this has controlled the signalling on the entire North Clyde network since established by British Rail in 1989.

Services 
From here alternate services run via Queen Street Low Level to  via  and via Central Low Level to  via  (2tph to each route - one Whifflet train continues to Motherwell).

After a timetable change in 2014, the Yoker line now receives 4tph all day on Mondays-Saturdays (previously the evening Argyle line services were cut back to Partick).

See also
Yoker line

References

External links 

Railway stations in West Dunbartonshire
Former North British Railway stations
Railway stations in Great Britain opened in 1882
Railway stations in Great Britain closed in 1917
Railway stations in Great Britain opened in 1919
SPT railway stations
Railway stations served by ScotRail
Clydebank